Gqeberha, also known by its former name Port Elizabeth and widely referred to as P.E., is a major seaport and the most populous city in the Eastern Cape province of South Africa. It is the seat of the Nelson Mandela Bay Metropolitan Municipality, South Africa's second-smallest metropolitan municipality by area. It is the sixth-most populous city in South Africa and is the cultural, economic and financial centre of the Eastern Cape.

The city was founded as Port Elizabeth in 1820 by Sir Rufane Donkin, who was the governor of the Cape at the time. He named it after his late wife, Elizabeth, who had died in India. The Donkin memorial in the CBD of the city bears testament to this. It was established by the government of the Cape Colony when 4,000 British colonists settled in Algoa Bay to strengthen the border region between the Cape Colony and the Xhosa. It is nicknamed "The Friendly City" or "The Windy City". In 2019, the Eastern Cape Geographical Names Committee recommended that Port Elizabeth be renamed Gqeberha, after the Xhosa and Southern Khoe name for the Baakens River that flows through the city. The city's name change was officially gazetted on 23 February 2021, although the new name remained poorly used locally as of 2022.

Located on the western portion of Algoa Bay along the southeastern coast of South Africa, the city lies 770 km east of Cape Town. It is east of the Garden Route and faces the Indian Ocean.  It covers 251 square kilometers of the Nelson Mandela Bay metropolitan area, South Africa's sixth-largest metropolitan municipality. The city's warm oceanic climate ranks it among the top cities in the world for pleasant year-round weather. The city is known for many blue-flag beaches along the city's urban coastline; its popularity as an international and local holiday destination; and its rich and diverse cultural heritage. It is a gateway city for the Eastern Cape's adventure, outdoor and African big five game safari tourism.

Etymology 
In 1820, the rising seaport of Algoa Bay was named "Port Elizabeth" in memory of Elizabeth Frances née Markham, the late wife of Rufane Shaw Donkin, acting Governor of the Cape Colony. Colonists also called the settlement "The Bay". The settlement is also known by Xhosa speakers as "iBhayi" or "eBhayi", a Xhosa adaptation of the Afrikaans name "die Baai", meaning "the bay".

Gqeberha, the city's official name since 23 February 2021, is a Xhosa word used to refer to the Baakens river, which flows through the city.

History

Prehistory 
Cave sites in the area, such as Albany, Wilton and Howiesons Poort, have given their names to various archaeological cultures. The Howiesons Poort has been of particular interest to interpretations about the origins of fully modern human behaviour. Dating to 65,000 to 62,000 years ago, it has yielded extremely old evidence for bow-and-arrow hunting and shell-bead jewellery. Earlier and Middle Stone Age lithic material has been found in the Sundays River Valley, while at the important site of Amanzi Springs, 40 km north of the Port Elizabeth near Addo, Earlier Stone Age artefacts are found in situ with well-preserved plant and faunal remains within spring sediments (Deacon, 1970). There is Later Stone Age archaeological material preserved in caves and rock shelters, such as Melkhoutboom Cave, in the Cape Fold Belt Mountain surrounding Port Elizabeth (see Deacon and Deacon, 1963; Deacon, 1976; Binneman, 1997) and large numbers of coastal shell middens have been reported at Humewood, St Georges Strand and the Coega River Mouth (Rudner, 1968). Most recently, Binneman and Webley (1997) reported thirteen shell middens and stone tool scatters about 500 m east of the Coega River mouth in the archaeological assessment carried out for the development of maritime infrastructure for the Port of Ngqura. Importantly, some of this archaeological material was recorded in secondary context in the gravels from older river terraces along the banks of the Coega River.

Early history 
Hunters and gatherers ancestral to the San first settled the area around what is now called Algoa Bay at least 10,000 years ago. Around 2,000 years ago, they were gradually assimilated by agriculturalist populations ancestral to the Xhosa people.

British settlement 
The first Europeans to visit the area sailed with the Portuguese explorers Bartholomeu Dias, who landed on St Croix Island in Algoa Bay in 1488, and Vasco da Gama, who noted the nearby Bird Island in 1497. For centuries, the area appeared on European navigation charts marked simply as "a landing place with fresh water".

The area became part of the Cape Colony. This area had a turbulent history between the settlement by the Dutch East India Company in 1652 and the formation of the Union of South Africa in 1910.

In 1799, at the time of the first British occupation of the Colony during the Napoleonic Wars, British troops built a stone fort named Fort Frederick after the Duke of York. This fort, aiming to deter a possible landing of French troops, was constructed to oversee the site of what later became Port Elizabeth. The fort is now preserved as a monument.

From 1814 to 1821, the Strandfontein farm was owned by Piet Retief. He later became a Voortrekker leader and was killed in 1837 by Zulu king Dingane during negotiations about land. An estimated 500 men, woman and children of his party were massacred. Frederik Korsten owned the Strandfontein farm after Retief. The suburb of Korsten was named after Frederick in the 19th century. This area was later developed as Summerstrand, a beach suburb.

In 1820, a party of 4,000 British settlers arrived by sea, encouraged by the government of the Cape Colony to form a settlement to strengthen the border region between the Cape Colony and the Xhosa people. At this time the seaport town was founded by Sir Rufane Shaw Donkin, the Acting Governor of the Cape Colony (in office: 1820–1821). 
Diplomat Edmund Roberts visited Port Elizabeth in the early 1830s. Roberts noted that Port Elizabeth in the 1820s had "contained four houses, and now it has upward of one hundred houses, and its residents are rated at above twelve hundred persons".

The Roman Catholic Church established the Apostolic Vicariate of Cape of Good Hope, Eastern District in the city in 1847. Port Elizabeth was granted the status of autonomous municipality in 1861. 

Cape Colony Prime Minister John Molteno had formed the Cape Government Railways in 1872. Completion of the railway to Kimberley in 1873 was a major stimulus to trade and a rapid increase in population in the town. With the massive expansion of the Cape Colony's railway network to the interior over the following years, the harbour of Gqeberha became the focus for serving import and export needs of a large area of the Cape's hinterland. The rapid economic development around the port, which followed the railway construction, caused Port Elizabeth to be nicknamed "the Liverpool of South Africa", after the major British port. The town expanded as a diverse community, comprising Xhosa as well as European, Cape Malay, and other immigrants.

During the Second Boer War of 1899–1902, the port served as an important transit-point for British soldiers, horses, and materials headed by railway to the front. No armed conflict took place within the city, but it felt the effects of the war with the arrival of many refugees who moved into the city. These included Boer women and children, whom the British interned in a concentration camp. 

After the war, the British erected a monument to military horses that died during the war. "The unveiling of the monument commemorating the services of the horses which perished during the Anglo Boer War, 1899–1902, took place on Saturday afternoon, February 11, 1905, with the Mayor, Mr A Fettes, performing the ceremony."

Apartheid era
Under apartheid, the South African government established legal racial segregation and started programs to separate communities physically as well as by classification and custom. The forced relocation under the auspices of the Group Areas Act of the non-white population from mixed areas began in 1962, causing various townships to be built for their use. Classification was sometimes arbitrary, and as in many other localities throughout the country, many citizens appearing to have mixed ancestry were at times subject to re-classification, which often had intrusive sociopolitical results. The non-white tenants of South End, and land owners in Fairview were forcibly relocated from 1965 through to 1975, as these areas were valued as prime real estate. The city-planning was viewed as the prototypical apartheid city.

As black South Africans organized to try to achieve civil rights and social justice, government repression increased. In 1977 Steve Biko, the black anti-apartheid activist, was interrogated and tortured by the security police in Port Elizabeth before being taken to Pretoria, where he died. Other notable deaths in the city during this time included those of The Cradock Four, and of George Botha, a high-school teacher.

1952 Defiance Campaign

In 1952 the African National Congress and the South African Indian Congress (SAIC) called all South Africans to stand up against the apartheid government's unjust laws directed at the black African, Indian and coloured population. On April 6, while most white South Africans celebrated the tercentenary of Jan van Riebeeck's arrival at the Cape in 1652, the ANC and SAIC called on black South Africans to observe the day as "A National Day of Pledge and Prayer". 15 000 people attended in Johannesburg, 10 000 in Cape Town, 10 000 in Durban and 20 000 in Port Elizabeth. The meeting in Port Elizabeth was led by Professor Z. K. Matthews and by Raymond Mhlaba.

On 25 July 1952, a day before the official start of the Defiance Campaign, 30 volunteers led by Raymond Mhlaba gathered at the New Brighton Civic Centre and prayed throughout the night. At 5am on 26 July, they left the Civic Centre and walked towards the New Brighton Railway Station. In Raymond Mhlaba's Personal Memoirs: Reminiscing from Rwanda and Uganda, Mhlaba recalled:

"I led the very first group and we entered the 'Europeans Only' section of the New Brighton station. By half past six we were already in police vans on our way to jail. It turned out that my party (group) was the very first to defy unjust laws in the whole of South Africa. Little did we know that we were making history."

Mhlaba became the first man to be arrested during the campaign, while Florence Matomela was the first woman. 2 007 people were arrested in Port Elizabeth during the Defiance Campaign included Oom Gov (Govan Mbeki) and Vuyisile Mini. Other volunteers who emerged as key role players during the campaign included Nosipho Dastile, Nontuthuzelo Mabala, Lilian Diedricks and Veronica Sobukwe.

1985 Consumer Boycotts

After the formation of the ANC-affiliated United Democratic Front in 1983, political consciousness in black townships grew. With numerous protests across the country and the massacre in Langa township near Uitenhage, police presence had increased in South African townships. In the townships, black South Africans demanded the integration of public institutions, the removal of troops from black townships, and the end of workplace discrimination. To launch an effective campaign to cripple the white-owned institutions of Port Elizabeth and to undermine the legitimacy of apartheid, several women suggested the idea of a consumer boycott to the Port Elizabeth Black Civic Organisation (PEBCO) in May 1985. The economic boycott began on July 15, 1985, and received massive support in townships around Port Elizabeth. By September 1985, white business-owners became desperate and called on the government to meet the demands of black South Africans. In November the boycott was still hurting white businesses in Port Elizabeth greatly. The white South African government reached an agreement with PEBCO which stated that the boycott would halt until March 1986 if business owners arranged for the release of black leaders.

In 1986, as the deal was approaching its end, the boycotters imposed a deadline of March 31, stating that the boycott would resume if the initial demands were not met. On March 11, the government unexpectedly banned two leaders, one of whom was Mkuseli Jack. However, on March 22, the ban was lifted by the decision of a Supreme Court Justice on the grounds that the government had given insufficient reasons. Jack ripped up the ban papers, and used the celebration as a way to represent the solidarity that the campaign required. As the demands of the boycotters were not met by March 31, the boycott was renewed on April 1. The boycott continued for nine weeks, but on June 12, 1986, another state of emergency was imposed by the National Party government. Security forces searched through the townships, arresting thousands and raiding the offices of black civics, trade unions, the UDF, the South African Council, and churches and also confiscating documents.

Modern history

With the establishment of the  Coega Industrial Development Zone (CIDZ), foreign direct and also national-level investment has improved in the greater region of Nelson Mandela Bay. The IDZ, under the stewardship of the Coega Development Corporation (CDC), since inception has managed to attract to investment account in excess of R140-billion into the economy of the Eastern Cape and has enabled the creation of over 45,000 jobs. This is significant for the area and the economy of the Eastern Cape. 

In 2001, the Nelson Mandela Bay Metropolitan Municipality was formed as an administrative area covering Port Elizabeth, the neighbouring towns of Uitenhage and Despatch and the surrounding agricultural areas. The name honours former President Nelson Mandela. The combined metropolitan area had a population estimated at around 1.3 million in 2006.

2010 FIFA World Cup
Overtaking its next door neighbouring city East London, it became the host city for the 2010 FIFA World Cup. The Nelson Mandela Bay Stadium hosted eight World Cup games were South Korea vs Greece, Ivory Coast vs Portugal, Germany vs Serbia; Chile vs Switzerland, Slovenia vs England in the Group Stage, then Uruguay, South Korea in the Round of 16. A quarter-final between Netherlands, Brazil was hosted, then for the Third Place playoff, Uruguay, Germany were hosted at the stadium. The World Cup was played between 11 June 2010 and 11 July 2010. Spain were the eventual champions.

2013 Africa Cup of Nations
The city was also one of the five that hosted the 2013 Africa Cup of Nations. The same stadium that was used in the 2010 World Cup hosted eight games: five matches in Group B—Ghana vs DR Congo, Mali vs Niger, Ghana vs Mali; DR Congo vs Niger, and Ghana vs Niger; one match in Group A—Cape Verde vs Angola, the quarterfinal—Ghana vs Cape Verde, and the third place playoff—Ghana vs Mali. The Africa Cup of Nations took place between 19 January and 10 February 2013. Nigeria were eventual champions.

Geography

Topography

Climate

Under the Köppen climate classification, the city has an oceanic climate (Cfb). The area lies between the winter rainfall, Mediterranean climate zones of the Western Cape and the summer rainfall regions of eastern South Africa. Winters are cool but mild and summers are warm but considerably less humid and hot than more northerly parts of South Africa's east coast. The climate is very even throughout the year with extreme heat or moderate cold rare.

Biodiversity
The city represents a large percentage of South Africa's biological diversity is a confluence point five of the seven South African biomes, namely the Thicket, Grassland, Nama-Karoo, Fynbos and Forest Biomes. A number of municipal nature reserves have been included in, and can be visited along the "Outward Bound Route" of the city. A mosaic of these 5 Biomes could be experienced in these reserves. The outward bound route is an eco-outdoor adventure and sports route incorporating walking and wildlife experiences. The aim of this route is to spread tourism to similar attractions along the route, leading to increased foot traffic and related benefits to these sites.

Architecture 

As a British colonial town, it had a strongly British character, and the central area retains that to this day. The colonial City Hall is a national monument. The main public library is an excellent example of Victorian Gothic architecture. Various memorials are situated throughout the city environs, and there are many tours available to familiarise visitors with especially the apartheid era. The city could be considered to be the country's leading centre of Art Deco style architecture due to its European heritage. Many buildings display the intricate stonework, wrought iron and stained glass of that era which are prominently visible in the Central Historical areas of the city. Combinations of Art Nouveau and Colonial styles are seen in residences along Cape Road. The area also boasts a collection of Cape Dutch style architecture as well as the Victorian and Edwardian styles, resulting from the arrival of the 1820 British settlers. Although influenced by Dutch architecture, the Cape Dutch style is unique to South Africa and examples can be seen all over the Eastern and Western Cape.

Hydrology
The city has a long marine coastline on its outskirts, particularly southwards. Beaches like Kings Beach, Hobie Beach, Bluewater Bay, Sardinia Bay (just outside the city near Schoenmakerskop), and the beaches along Marine Drive are abundant. Kings Beach is adjacent to the harbour, and the longshore drift from Cape Recife provides a plentiful supply of sea sand. On the north westerly coastline, the contours tends to be rockier than the area between Cape Recife, and the Port of Ngqura. There are a few rivers, of which the Baakens River is the most prominent. This river usually floods when a reasonable amount precipitation is observed, especially at low level crossings. North End Lake in North End is the largest natural freshwater body in the city, but has experienced a form of contamination from industry. (It is not recommended to ingest anything from this lake) Also, numerous smaller "lakes" are in the surrounding area, namely Lake Farm.  The Eastern Cape is experiencing a devastating drought, of which a disaster has been declared by the current office bearers of the municipality. Water restrictions are in place, and measures are in place to provide enough water in the near future, namely freshwater treatment works being constructed to acquire additional water from the Gariep Dam.

Demographics

In the 2011 census, Port Elizabeth was the most populous city in the Eastern Cape. In 2011:
 Area: 
 Population: 312,392: 
 Households: 99,794:

Economy
The economy is primarily oriented towards automotive assembly, manufacturing and export industries, and the city is also a major South African and sub-Saharan African destination for investment. Foreign direct investments of $19,8 billion has been secured over the past decade. Several Fortune 500 companies are present or have their African operations headquartered in the city.

Trade and industry

Historically, the majority of trade in the region came through Port Elizabeth. In the 1830s, at least five ships regularly transported goods to Europe. It became a free port in 1832. In 1833, about 50 vessels had moved through the port. In 1828, 55,201 pounds, (25038 kg), of goods were imported through the port, increasing by 1832 to 112,845 pounds, (51185 kg), imported in that year. Port Elizabeth exported 41,290 lbs, (18738 kg), in 1828, with a large increase to 86,931 lbs, (39431 kg), goods exported in 1829. Exports included wine, brandy, vinegar, ivory, hides and skins, leather, tallow, butter, soap, wool, ostrich feathers, salted beef, wheat, candles, aloe, barley, and more.

Home of South Africa's motor vehicle industry, the city boasts most vehicle assembly plants, General Motors, Ford, Volkswagen, Continental Tyres and many other automotive companies. As of 2018, after GM's exit from South Africa, Isuzu took over their production plant in Struandale. In 2016, Chinese state-owned automotive manufacturer BAIC and South Africa's Industrial Development Corporation announced a R11 billion joint venture for the establishment of a semi knock down vehicle assembly plant in Coega.  It is anticipated that the plant will go online in 2020.  The FAW also have built a multi-billion rand plant in the region. Most other industries are geared towards the motor vehicle industry, providing parts such as wiring harnesses, catalytic converters, batteries and tyres to the vehicle manufacturers.

The largest economic sectors in Nelson Mandela Bay Metro are manufacturing, finance, community services and transport. Community services, trade and manufacturing sectors are the sectors that create the most employment in the Metro. The city offers a wealth of tourism and recreation opportunity due to its biodiversity, beaches and open spaces.  Further still, Nelson Mandela Bay is a preferred region for the manufacturing of pharmaceuticals, flour, meat, frozen vegetables, soft drinks, chocolates, cheese, yoghurt, ice cream, paper and leather products. 

The city is also a major seaport, with the most significant car loading facilities in the southern hemisphere. As part of the ongoing development, a new Industrial Development Zone with expanded port facilities has been built at Coega.

Tourism

Located at the end of the picturesque Garden Route along the Cape coast, the city has beaches in and near it. The most popular swimming beaches include King's Beach and Hobie Beach.

Many local historic attractions are linked by the Donkin Heritage Trail. These include the Campanile (bell tower), built in 1923 to commemorate the arrival of the 1820 Settlers and offering a viewpoint over the city; the city hall (1862); the Donkin Reserve park and monument; and the old stone Fort Frederick itself (1799). The CBD also boasts the towering Eastern Cape post office headquarters.

Route 67 is a walking trail consisting of 67 public artworks, symbolising 67 years which Nelson Mandela dedicated to the freedom of South Africa. The artwork is a celebration of South African culture and history and is scattered along the route as it starts from the Campanile, up the stairs to the Vuysile Mini Market Square and to the large South African flag at the Donkin Reserve. The artworks were created by local Eastern Cape artists.

Other attractions include the gardens at St George's Park, the Nelson Mandela Metropolitan Art Museum (formerly known as the King George VI Art Gallery), the museum and oceanography room at Humewood, and the new Boardwalk waterfront complex.

The wider area surrounding PE also features game viewing opportunities, including the Addo Elephant National Park,  to the north near the Zuurberg mountain range.

It is also a destination for whale watching with humpback whales sighted between June and August, and again between November and January, southern right whales sighted between July and November, and Bryde's whales sighted all year round.

Property development

Nelson Mandela Bay has experienced a construction boom led by the Baywest Mall and Coega Development Corporation (CDC).

Baywest Mall which opened in May 2015 is the largest shopping centre in the Eastern Cape located on the western outskirts of the city and forms part of the Baywest City. Baywest City is a planned mixed-use development area and is striving to become a major development hub in the city's western suburbs.

Coega located just outside of the city once an industrial development zone (IDZ) has now deemed the status of a special economic zone (SEZ). It also houses the second and the newest port of Nelson Mandela Bay and South Africa, Port of Ngqura. This multi-billion rand project aims to drive local and foreign direct investments in export-oriented industries and position South Africa as the hub for Southern African trade.

Culture 
There is only one foreign cultural centre, the Alliance Française of Port Elizabeth, a French language school and a francophone cultural centre.

Sports 

It is the location of the St George's Park cricket ground, which holds test cricket matches. St George's Park is the oldest cricket ground in South Africa, and was the venue for the first Test match played outside of Australia or England, between South Africa and England on 12 and 13 March 1889. The Warriors, a franchise cricket team in South Africa, is based in Port Elizabeth. The stadium is also known for its band that entertains fans at the Proteas games.

In December 2011, Nelson Mandela Bay Stadium became the new home of the South Africa Sevens, the country's leg of the annual IRB Sevens World Series in rugby sevens. The event had previously been held in three other cities, most recently in George in the Western Cape from 2002 to 2010. As of 2015, is hosted annually in Cape Town, in the Western Cape.

The headquarters of the Southern Spears rugby franchise was in Port Elizabeth. The long-standing Eastern Province Rugby Union, now commonly known as the Eastern Province Elephants, formed the basis of the Spears franchise together with East London's Border Bulldogs. The remnants of the Spears were later reconstituted into the Southern Kings, also based in Port Elizabeth, which joined Super Rugby in 2013. The Southern Kings did not participate in Super Rugby in 2014 or 2015, and returned to Super Rugby in 2016, 2017, but were dropped for economical reasons by SARU. The team now competes in the Guinness Pro14. The Eastern Province Rugby Union play their home matches at Nelson Mandela Bay Stadium, built for the 2010 FIFA World Cup.

The biggest sporting events in the city, is the annual Ironman triathlon and the Herald Cycle tour. The Tuna classic deep-sea fishing competition attracts anglers from all over the world.

There are cricket, rugby union, athletics, association football, field hockey and many other sports facilities. Its coastal location also makes it a base for some watersports.

The city's main football club is Chippa United, they currently use the Nelson Mandela Bay Stadium as their home ground. Previous clubs to play in the country's top tier were Bay United, Michau Warriors, Port Elizabeth Blackpool, Hotspur F.C., Port Elizabeth City and Westview Apollon.

The Algoa Bay Yacht Club operates out of the port.

Government
Port Elizabeth had its own municipality from 1843 to 2000.  Since then, it has formed part of the Nelson Mandela Bay Metropolitan Municipality, and also serves as the seat for the surrounding Cacadu District Municipality. It has a Magistrate's Court, a local seat of the Eastern Cape Division of the High Court, and a branch of the Labour Court. As a result of the presence of a High Court, several other related organs of state such as a Masters Office and a Director of Public Prosecutions are present in the city.
All Government (mostly provincial) departments maintain branches or other offices in Gqeberha.

Coat of arms
The Port Elizabeth municipality assumed a coat of arms on 9 January 1878.  The design, prepared by Bradbury Wilkinson and Company (of London), was a simplified version of the arms of Sir Rufane Donkin: Gules,  on a chevron Argent between two cinquefoils in chief and a bugle horn stringed in base Or, three buckles Sable;  a chief embattled Argent thereon an elephant statant proper.  The crest was a sailing ship, and the motto In meliora spera.

(In layman's terms: a red shield displaying, from top to bottom, an elephant on a silver horizontal strip whose lower edge is embattled, two gold cinquefoils, a silver chevron bearing three black buckles, and a gold bugle horn.)

Eighty years later, in 1958, the council made slight changes to the arms, and had them granted by the College of Arms.  The changes consisted of adding two anchors to the chief of the shield, placing a red mural crown bearing three golden rings below the ship in the crest, and changing the motto to Tu meliora spera.  The arms were registered with the Cape Provincial Administration in 1959, and at the Bureau of Heraldry in 1986.

Education

Tertiary education
The Nelson Mandela University was formed by the amalgamation of the University of Port Elizabeth, Port Elizabeth Technikon, and the Port Elizabeth campus of Vista University. It is the largest university in the Eastern and Southern Cape, with around 29,000 students in seven faculties spread over seven campuses.

Russell Road College, Eduvos and AFDA also have campuses in the city.

Secondary education
The city has a number of top government-funded and private schools, including Alexander Road High School, Collegiate Girls' High School, Victoria Park High School, Grey High School, Otto du Plessis, Pearson High School, Woodridge College, Linkside High School, Andrew Rabie High School, Lawson Brown High School, and Morningside High School. Substance abuse appears to be a prevailing problem in some schools due to a lack of drug prevention training on the part of the educational system.

Transport

Roads 
Port Elizabeth lies on the N2 road. To the west the road travels the Garden Route to George and Cape Town; to the east, the road runs through the Border Country through Makhanda, to East London then on to Durban, terminating in Ermelo in Mpumalanga. The R75 connects the city to Despatch, Uitenhage and the Karoo. The major routes within the city are numbered as metropolitan or M routes.

The city's main bus station is in Market Square. The public bus service is run by the Algoa Bus Company.  Between 1881 and 1948, there was a Port Elizabeth tramway network, powered initially by horses, and later by electricity.

The city is in the process of building a bus rapid transit system which was intended for the 2010 FIFA World Cup. This has been a massive failure as local taxi associations have prevented the implementation.  The city lacks a proper public transport system which has had a negative impact on the poorer residents of the city who are dependent on public transport. Construction of the bus rapid transit network has been suspended due to mismanagement which led to the project missing its May 2010 deadline. Calls for the project, which has left many parts of the city in a permanent state of construction, have been made recently, and it is expected that the government will make a decision on the matter soon.

Railway
Port Elizabeth railway station is served by South Africa's rail network. Local commuter services are operated by Metrorail, while the Shosholoza Meyl long-distance passenger service links PE with Johannesburg via Bloemfontein where it is possible to connect with other long-distance routes.

The Apple Express narrow-gauge tourist train to Avontuur operated from the separate station in Humewood Road near King's Beach. It departed regularly for Thornhill Village via Van Stadens Bridge, the highest narrow-gauge rail bridge in the world. The Apple Express was launched to provide a service to transport fresh produce and wood from the farms along the line to Avontuur. The line was completed in 1914 and the train delivered produce directly from the farms to ships in the Port Elizabeth Harbour. Due to modern transport methods such as containerisation, and refrigerated containers and trucks, the Apple Express and its services became redundant. Service has now ceased.

In preparation for the 2010 World Cup Soccer event the Humerail Station was extensively upgraded. Several disused narrow gauge goods wagons were scrapped and removed from the site, several buildings in the area have also been renovated and revamped.

Air
Chief Dawid Stuurman International Airport (IATA airport code PLZ, ICAO airport code FAPE) serves the city for both passenger and cargo traffic. It is the fourth busiest airport in South Africa after O.R. Tambo International Airport, King Shaka International Airport in Durban, and Cape Town International Airport.

International visitors to the city must currently fly to either Johannesburg, Cape Town or Durban, and then take a domestic flight to Port Elizabeth. An upgrade to the terminal building, completed in 2004, created the necessary facilities to handle international flights although none are scheduled as yet.

Sea

The city has a harbour in Algoa Bay, and the construction of an additional international harbour at Coega has supported an increase in the size of the city's industries and the addition of new industries.

Municipal

Water sources
One of the water sources from which the city gets its water is via a series of canals, tunnels and rain basin transfer schemas that starts in the Free State at Gariep Dam – Transfer Scheme (Additional Documentaries Resource), about 5 hours away at 462km.
The water from Gariep Dam is transferred via the Orange-Fish River Project (Tunnel) into the  Great Fish River Valley, then again into the Sundays River Valley (Canals and Tunnels Scheme) North-West of the city. Since 1992 the water from the Sundays River Valley has been supplied to the city.

Gariep Dam water is also used for electricity generation by Eskom hydro-electric power station, remotely controlled from Gauteng. Therefore, it must be managed carefully by balancing the supply-and-demand of this water resource usage for its derivatives of electricity generation, irrigation, and municipal drinking water. Other nearby dams include Kouga Dam, Kromme Dam, Groendal Dam, Impofu Dam, and Lourie Dam.

Health care
The city has government-funded and private hospitals, including:

 
Aurora Rehabilitation Hospital
Dora Nginza Hospital
Elizabeth Donkin Hospital, (State Mental Asylum)
Empilweni Hospital
Hunterscraig Private Hospital (Private Mental Asylum)
Jose Pearson TB Hospital
Livingstone Hospital
Mercantile Private Hospital
Netcare Greenacres Hospital
Nightingale Subacute Hospital
Oasim Private Hospital
Port Elizabeth Provincial Hospital
St George's Hospital
Westways Private Hospital

Media

Radio
The city is served by a few radio stations, namely Algoa FM (regional radio broadcasting to the entire Eastern Cape, Garden Route, and globally via internet) and Umhlobo Wenene FM.

Newspapers
The Herald serves English readers in terms of newspapers, on a daily basis. Die Burger serves the Afrikaans-speaking communities with a well established readership base.

Television
The SABC has a regional office in the city.  Bay TV is a free-to-air station established by the Nelson Mandela Bay Municipality that broadcasts 24-hours a day, seven-days a week. The station focusses on African story-telling and creating platforms for local content creators, and receives funding from local government and corporate donors.

International relations

Twin towns and sister cities
  Beira, Mozambique
  Gothenburg, Sweden
  Jacksonville, United States
  Ningbo, China

Notable people

See also 
 Anglican Diocese of Port Elizabeth
 Bloemendal
 Donkin Heritage Trail
 List of heritage sites in Port Elizabeth
 National Monument
 Red Location Museum
 Victorian era

Notes

References

External links 

 
 Port Elizabeth of Yore: The Defiance Campaign of 1952

Port Elizabeth
Cities in South Africa
Port cities and towns of the Indian Ocean
Port cities in South Africa
Populated coastal places in South Africa
Populated places in Nelson Mandela Bay
1820 establishments in the Cape Colony
Populated places established in 1820